During the 1995–96 English football season, Luton Town F.C. competed in the Football League First Division.

Season summary
Terry Westley was promoted as Pleat's successor from youth team coach, but was sacked after just six months in charge. Lennie Lawrence was brought in as a replacement, but he was unable to stop Luton from finishing bottom of Division One.

Final league table

Squad

References

Luton Town F.C. seasons
Luton Town